Chitram is a 2000 Indian Telugu-language romantic comedy film written and directed by Teja. This film stars debutants Uday Kiran and Reema Sen in the lead roles. The film was sensational hit in 2000. The film is produced by Ramoji Rao.The music of the movie was composed by R.P. Patnaik. The film was released as Chithiram in Tamil in 2001 with the film mostly featuring scenes dubbed from the original although scenes involving Manivannan and Senthil were added. The movie was remade in Kannada as Chitra and was a successful venture. The film ran for 100 days in 12 centers.

Plot
Janaki and her sister are NRIs who want to join a PU college in AP. Janaki stays with her uncle and procures the admission in the same college as Ramana, a die-hard music fan. When Janaki first sees him in the music room practicing they get attracted to each other. When family members of Ramana are away, Janaki happens to come to Ramana's house wearing a saree. As she does not know how to drape a saree, all she does is wrap it around her body. Ramana offers to teach her how to wear a saree and accidentally puts his hand inside her slip which makes them feel shy and attracted. In the process they consummate their passion. After a few days Janaki informs Ramana that she is pregnant. Ramana, along with his friends, hires a nurse to perform abortion on Janaki. When Ramana asks Janaki to prepare for the abortion, she refuses to do so as she says she wants the company of a child. Janaki tells him that her mother used to tell her that when she dies she will be reborn as Janaki's child. Janaki is then told by the college Principal to get rest and write her exams the following year. When Ramana's parents talk to Janaki's uncle, he blames Ramana.

Soon Ramana and Janaki move into a new house and Ramana is hired as a guitar player in a club. Janaki delivers a child in the hospital during Ramana's exams on which he can't concentrate and can't write anything. His lecturer tells him to study well as he has not done well in the previous tests also. But Janaki expects him to help her out in taking care of their baby. Ramana starts getting fed up of Janaki and the baby and starts refusing to change the baby's diaper and even to take care of the baby for a minute when Janaki is in the kitchen. During this time Ramana loses his job in the club and Janaki confronts him about his behaviour. Now angry, Ramana shouts and blames Janaki that she ruined his life, future and career. The next day when Ramana is writing his examination, Janaki brings the baby in a bassinet, approaches Ramana and leaves the baby in the exam hall and runs away to make Ramana understand the difficulty of raising a baby alone. The invigilator holds the crying baby until Ramana has finished his exam. Ramana returns home with the baby and regrets yelling at Janaki and takes care of the baby. One day when he is sleeping the baby disappears and Ramana goes searching for the child all over the city. He comes back home worried without finding the baby when Janaki returns home with the baby. Ramana apologises to her. Janaki tells him that she is pregnant again. In the end, the couple walks to college with the baby in the bassinet.

Cast
 Uday Kiran as Ramana
 Reema Sen as Janaki
 Seenu as Ramana's friend
 Uttej as Milk man
 Tanikella Bharani as Ramana's father
 Delhi Rajeshwari as Ramana's mother
 Banerjee as Janaki's uncle
 Rallapalli as College lecturer
 AVS as Music Store owner
 Basha as Ramana's friend
 Amitov Teja in a cameo appearance in the song "Kukka Kavali"

Release
The success of the film and Reemma Sen's popularity in Tamil Nadu prompted the producers to dub and partially reshoot scenes in Tamil. Actors including Manivannan, Senthil, Charle, Manorama and Kalpana were signed on, while singers from Sun TV's Sapta Swarangal programme were used for the soundtrack.

Soundtrack
The film's soundtrack was composed by R. P. Patnaik.

Reception 
A critic from Sify wrote that "Teja delivers a wholesome entertainer by narrating the theme in an entertaining way to attract all kinds of audience". Jeevi of Idlebrain.com rated the film four out of five.

References

External links 
 

2000 films
2000s Telugu-language films
Telugu films remade in other languages
Indian teen romance films
Films directed by Teja (film director)
Indian teen drama films
Indian pregnancy films
Teenage pregnancy in film
2000s teen romance films
Films scored by R. P. Patnaik
2000 directorial debut films